Shortcut Romeo is an Indian action crime thriller film directed and produced by Susi Ganeshan, under the banner of Susi Ganesh Productions. It is the Hindi remake of the director's own Tamil film Thiruttu Payale (2006), starring Neil Nitin Mukesh in the title role with Puja Gupta as his love interest, and Ameesha Patel in a negative character. The theatrical trailer of Shortcut Romeo was unveiled on 25 January 2013. The film was screened at Marche du Film at Cannes Film Festival on 22 May 2013. It released on 21 June 2013 to a largely mixed critical reception.

Plot
Suraj (Neil Nitin Mukesh) is a good-for-nothing youth who throws his weight around his house with his violent attitude. One day, in a fit of rage, he injures his younger brother, following which he is sent off from Goa to Mumbai to his uncle's house. Suraj chances upon Monica. She is the wife of a rich man and comes to learn golf, but her coach becomes interested on her and they make love in a golf park. He records this act on a video camera. He then finds out that it is an extramarital affair and that the lovers, Monica (Ameesha Patel) and Ashish, are rich. Despite Monica offering large sums of money for the tape, Suraj refuses to part with it. His demand is much greater. He wants an assurance from her that she will provide him with a luxurious life.

Monica has no choice; she succumbs to Suraj's blackmail and Suraj foots his holiday in Kenya along with his friends. Monica tries to outsmart Suraj at every stage. Suraj meets Sherry (Puja Gupta) a rich but lonely girl and falls in love with her. That's when he begins to realize that there are things more important than money in life. The cat and mouse game between Monica and Suraj, and the way one alternately checkmates the other in every round goes on till Rahul, Monica's husband, hires a private detective. Sherry gets caught in this cross-fire. The later part of the story ends with an interesting twist and turns.

Cast
 Neil Nitin Mukesh as Suraj
 Ameesha Patel as Monica
 Yogender Kumar as Suraj's Best Friend
 Puja Gupta as Sherry / Raathikha
 Rajesh Shringarpure as Rahul
 Jatin Grewal as Ashish
 Susi Ganeshan as Detective Agent (Cameo)
 Errol Marks
 Meherzan Mazda
 Vrajesh Hirjee
 Mumaith Khan
 Himesh Reshammiya in a special appearance in a song.
 Bikramjeet Kanwarpal as a Police inspector
 Ashutosh Kaushik

Production

Casting
Post Kanthaswamy (2009), Susi Ganeshan announced plans to make his debut in Bollywood by remaking his own Tamil film Thiruttu Payale (2006). It was rumoured that Emraan Hashmi was approached to play the title role, while Bipasha Basu and Deepika Padukone were contenders to play a negative role. However, Ganeshan put a rest to these rumours stating that none of the rumoured actors have been considered for his film. In September 2011, it was announced that Neil Nitin Mukesh and Ameesha Patel were the finalized as the protagonist and antagonist. The film went on floors in November, with Richa Gangopadhyay playing Mukesh's love interest. However, after differences with the director, she dropped out and the role was offered to Puja Gupta. Once Puja was on board, the film's shooting progressed swiftly. A special song was also shot on the lead pair to music by Himesh Reshamiya.

Filming
Principal photography started in November 2011. The major portion of the first schedule was filmed mainly in Mumbai and a few other places in India. The second schedule began in January and was filmed in Kenya. The schedule lasted for more than 20 days covering the Masai Mara and a few neighbouring places.

Critical response
Shortcut Romeo got a very minuscule released by its producer and hence opened to a low 5 million response on opening day and ended its 1st week with a nett domestic collections of just 22.7 million.

Soundtrack
The Soundtrack of the film is composed by Himesh Reshammiya and the music is sold to T-Series. Lyrics are penned by Sameer, Shabbir Ahmed, Manoj Yadav and Sanjay Masoom.

References

External links
 
 

2013 crime thriller films
2010s chase films
Hindi remakes of Tamil films
2010s Hindi-language films
Indian crime thriller films
Films shot in Kenya
2013 films
Films scored by Himesh Reshammiya
Films about stalking
Indian chase films
Films directed by Susi Ganeshan